Vasily Melnikov (15 September 1943 – 19 September 2017) was a Soviet alpine skier. He competed at the 1964 Winter Olympics and the 1968 Winter Olympics.

References

1943 births
2017 deaths
Soviet male alpine skiers
Olympic alpine skiers of the Soviet Union
Alpine skiers at the 1964 Winter Olympics
Alpine skiers at the 1968 Winter Olympics
Sportspeople from Bryansk